The  is a peninsula that encompasses the entirety of Chiba Prefecture on Honshu, the largest island of Japan. It is part of the Greater Tokyo Area. It forms the eastern edge of Tokyo Bay, separating it from the Pacific Ocean.

Description

The Bōsō Peninsula is defined by the Pacific Ocean to its east and south, Tokyo Bay to the west, and the Edo and Tone rivers to the north. The Bōsō Hill Range forms the backbone of the south of the peninsula, and much of the area is hilly. From south to north the Bōsō Hill Range gives way to the Shimōsa Plateau, which covers much of the area of northern Chiba Prefecture, and ends in the lower areas around the Tone River.

The northern and western parts of the Bōsō Peninsula are highly urbanized. The Shimōsa Plateau and the coastal lowlands and interior river valleys are chiefly used for rice cultivation. The western coast of the peninsula is home to the Keiyō Industrial Zone, which ranges from Urayasu on the border of Tokyo in the northwest of the peninsula to Futtsu to the south. The Tokyo Bay Aqua-Line, a bridge-tunnel across Tokyo Bay, connects Kisarazu with the city of Kawasaki in Kanagawa Prefecture. The northeast of the peninsula is home to Suigo-Tsukuba Quasi-National Park, which spans across both Ibaraki and Chiba prefectures, and much of the remainder of the eastern coast of the peninsula is designated as Minami Bōsō Quasi-National Park.

Etymology

The peninsula gets its name and kanji from the former provinces that were located there: Awa (安房),  Kazusa (上総) and Shimōsa (下総). The Japan Meteorological Agency refers to the west and east coasts of the peninsula as Uchibō (内房) and Sotobō (外房) respectively.

References

Landforms of Chiba Prefecture
Peninsulas of Japan